The 1979–80 season was the 81st season for FC Barcelona.

Squad

La Liga

League table

Results

External links

webdelcule.com

FC Barcelona seasons
Barcelona